Grygorii Vasylovych Vovchynskyi (born 4 July 1988) is a Ukrainian biathlete, cross-country skier, and Paralympian. He is classified LW8 (single arm amputation), and compete in classification category standing.

Career
He finished the Cherkasy National University (2012).

He competed in biathlon and cross-country skiing at the 2010 Winter Paralympics in Vancouver, Canada. In cross-country skiing he won silver in the men's relay, open with Iurii Kostiuk, Vitaliy Lukyanenko and Volodymyr Ivanov, and a bronze medal in the 10 km, standing. He placed 6th in the men's 1 km sprint and 15th in the 20 km, standing. In biathlon, he took the silver medal in the 12.5 km, and the bronze medal in the men's 3 km pursuit, standing.

He competed at the 2022 Winter Paralympics, winning a gold medal in Men's 6 kilometres Biathlon, standing.

References

External links 
 

Ukrainian male cross-country skiers
Ukrainian male biathletes
Paralympic biathletes of Ukraine
Paralympic cross-country skiers of Ukraine
Biathletes at the 2010 Winter Paralympics
Cross-country skiers at the 2010 Winter Paralympics
Paralympic gold medalists for Ukraine
Paralympic silver medalists for Ukraine
Paralympic bronze medalists for Ukraine
1988 births
Living people
Biathletes at the 2014 Winter Paralympics
Medalists at the 2010 Winter Paralympics
Medalists at the 2014 Winter Paralympics
Medalists at the 2022 Winter Paralympics
Biathletes at the 2018 Winter Paralympics
Biathletes at the 2022 Winter Paralympics
Paralympic medalists in cross-country skiing
Paralympic medalists in biathlon
Cross-country skiers at the 2022 Winter Paralympics
Sportspeople from Cherkasy Oblast